Churchill County High School is located in Fallon, Churchill County, Nevada. The building was built in 1917, and was opened in 1920.

Academics
Part of the Churchill County School District, operating under the Principal Kevin Lords, the school has around 1400 students in grades 9–12.

Education standards are very high, with Churchill County's Academic Team being placed 1st in the Nevada Academic League in results published in April 2006, and a teacher at the School, Steve Johnson, being a winner of the Presidential Awards for Excellence in Mathematics and Science Teaching, the Nation's highest honors for teachers of mathematics and science, in 1999.

Notable alumni 

 Alan Bible, lawyer and politician, served as a United States Senator from Nevada from 1954 to 1974.
Harvey Dahl, football offensive guard for the St. Louis Rams - Jersey #59 retired in January 2009.
Josh Mauga, football player for the Kansas City Chiefs - Jersey Number 30 retired on October 27, 2011
 Aarik Wilson, long jumper and triple jumper; athlete in the 2008 Summer Olympics

Churchill County High School has a long history of students serving in the uniform services as well as being accepted into prominent academic institutions.

Discipline
In November 2006 closed circuit television was installed, the first school in the state to have such a comprehensive system, and has proven effective in enhancing discipline.

This was needed since according to a regional survey, almost 7% of Churchill County students have used methamphetamine, and anecdotal data points to a number closer to 15%.

Pellet gun incident 
On January 22, 2020, a male student brought a pneumatic pellet gun into his classroom. He did not harm any students. He was later arrested the next day for possession of a weapon on school grounds.

See also 
 List of high schools in Nevada

References

External links 
 

Schools in Churchill County, Nevada
Public high schools in Nevada
Educational institutions established in 1917
1917 establishments in Nevada